= 2013 World Freestyle Skating Championships =

Rollerskating championship

- Location: Taipei City, Taiwan
- Start date: November 5, 2013
- End date: November 8, 2013

The 7th World Freestyle Skating Championships were held in Taipei City, Taiwan from November 5 to November 8, 2013. 24 countries took part in the competition

== Participating nations ==
24 nations entered the competition.

- Argentina
- Belarus
- Brazil
- Chile
- China
- Chinese Taipei
- France
- Great Britain
- Germany
- Hong Kong
- India
- Iran
- Italy
- Japan
- Malaysia
- Mexico
- Poland
- Russia
- Singapore
- South Korea
- Spain
- Thailand
- Ukraine
- Yemen

== Medallists ==
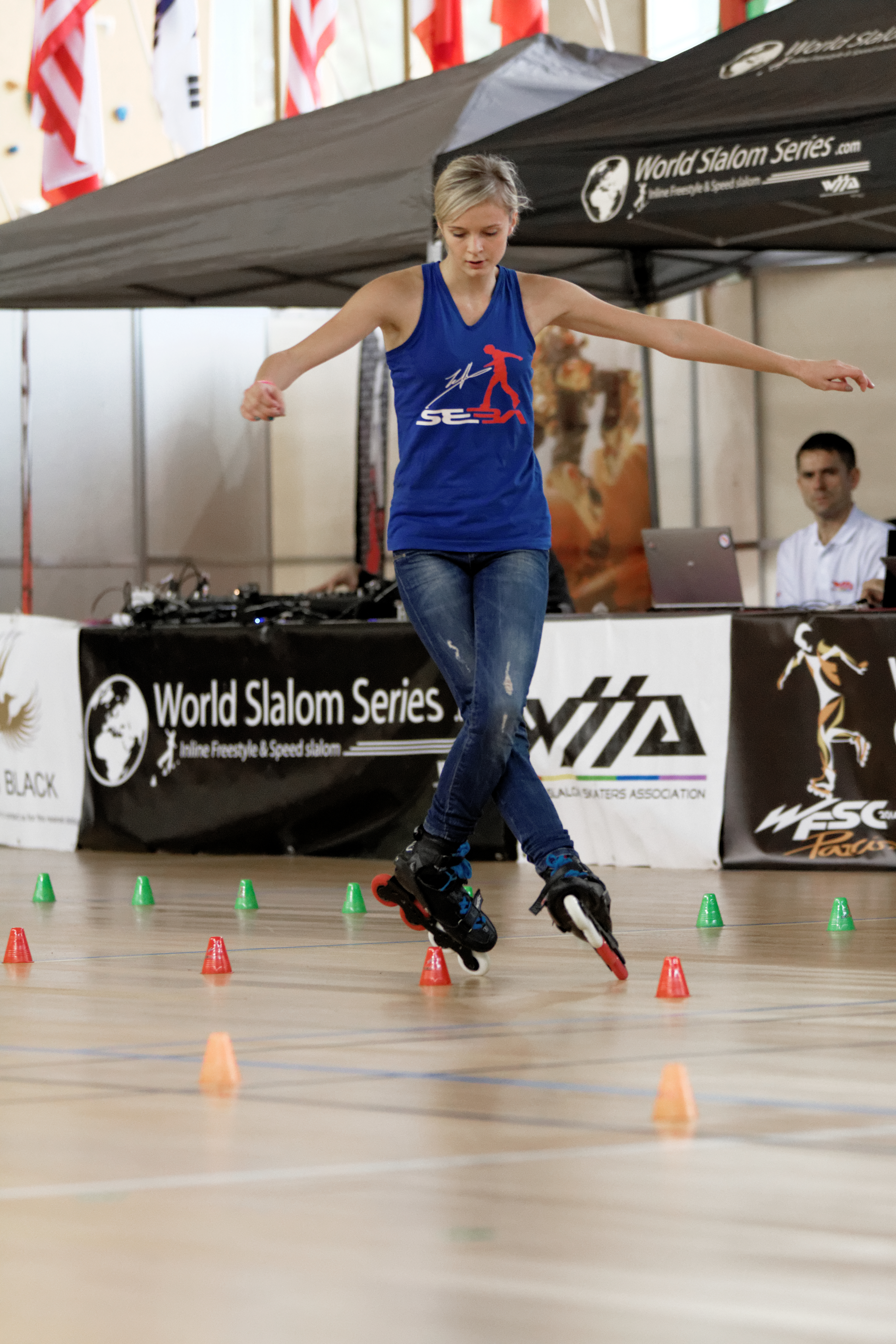
Klaudia Hartmanis during the 2014 World Freestyle Skating Championships.

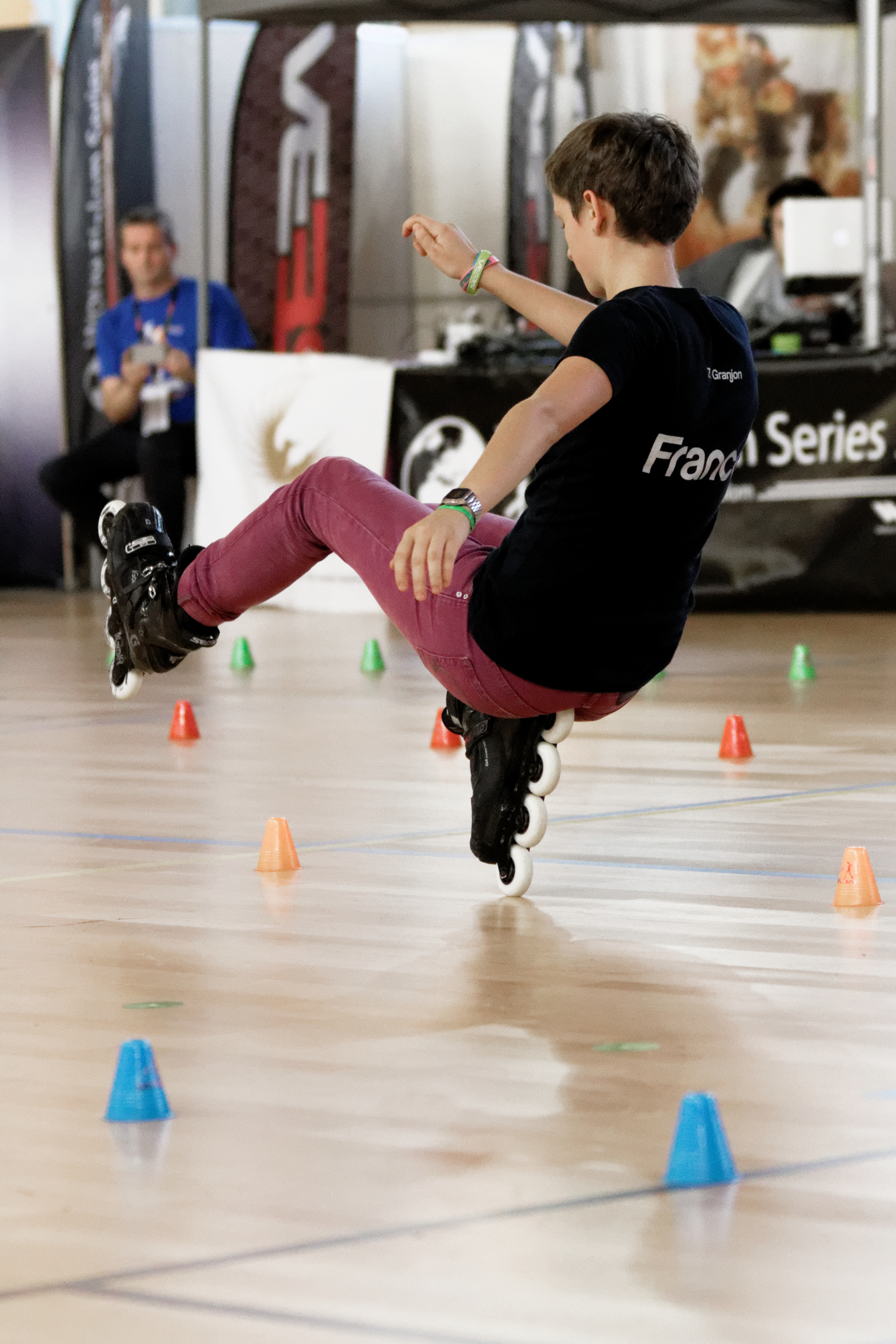
Zoé Granjon during the 2014 World Freestyle Skating Championships.

Event	Gold	Silver	Bronze
Speed slalom
Junior Men	China (CHN); Pan Yu Shuo	Hong Kong (HKG); Chan Man Fung Anson	China (CHN); Ye Hao Qin
Junior Women	Chinese Taipei (TPE); Su Yu Jou	Chinese Taipei (TPE); Lo Pei-Yu	Iran (IRI); Arabi Laya
Senior Men	Italy (ITA); Davide Piacenti	China (CHN); Guo Fang	Chinese Taipei (TPE); Wu Dong-Yan
Senior Women	Chinese Taipei (TPE); Wang Tzu-Chien	Italy (ITA); Barbara Bossi	Chinese Taipei (TPE); Liang Hsuan Min
Pair slalom
mixed	China (CHN); Zhang Hao and Guo Fang	Poland (POL); Klaudia Hartmanis and Michał Sulinowski	Italy (ITA); Lorenzo Guslandi and Tiziano Ferrari
Freestyle slides
Men	China (CHN); Huang Hai Yang	Chinese Taipei (TPE); Chung Yung-Tzu	China (CHN); Zeng You Xing
Women	China (CHN); Liu Luan	Russia (RUS); Olga Fokina	Singapore (SIN); Rebecca Chew Rui Jun
Freestyle Slalom « Classic »
Junior Men	China (CHN); Ye Hao Qin	China (CHN); Zhang Hao	Japan (JPN); Masayoshi Shibagaki
Junior Women	China (CHN); Feng Hui	China (CHN); Wang Ding Yu Xin	China (CHN); Guan Yu Xing
Senior Men	South Korea (KOR); Lee Chong Goon	South Korea (KOR); Yu Jin Seong	France (FRA); Romain Lebois
Senior Women	China (CHN); Su Fei Qian	China (CHN); Meng Yun	Russia (RUS); Daria Kuznetsova
Freestyle Slalom « Battle »
Men	China (CHN); Ye Hao Qin	China (CHN); Zhang Hao	France (FRA); Romain Lebois
Women	China (CHN); Su Fei Qian	Russia (RUS); Daria Kuznetsova	France (FRA); Zoé Granjon

== Medal table ==
Rank	Nation	Gold	Silver	Bronze	Total
1	China (CHN)	9	5	3	17
2	Chinese Taipei (TPE)	2	2	2	6
3	Italy (ITA)	1	1	1	3
4	South Korea (KOR)	1	1	0	2
5	Russia (RUS)	0	2	1	3
6	Hong Kong (HKG)	0	1	0	1
6	Poland (POL)	0	1	0	1
8	France (FRA)	0	0	3	3
9	Iran (IRN)	0	0	1	1
9	Japan (JPN)	0	0	1	1
9	Singapore (SGP)	0	0	1	1
Totals (11 entries)		13	13	13	39
