= 2014 World Freestyle Skating Championships =

- Venue: Gymnase de la Plaine
- Location: Paris, France
- Start date: October 22, 2014
- End date: October 26, 2014
- Competitors: 200 from 35 nations

The 8th World Freestyle Skating Championships were held in Paris, France from October 22 to October 26, 2014. 35 countries took part in the competition.

== Participating nations ==
35 nations entered the competition.

- Argentina
- Australia
- Belgium
- Belarus
- Brazil
- Bulgaria
- Canada
- Chile
- China
- Colombia
- Czech Republic
- Estonia
- France
- Great Britain
- Germany
- Hong Kong
- Iran
- Italy
- South Korea
- Saudi Arabia
- Malaysia
- Mexico
- Norway
- Paraguay
- Poland
- Portugal
- Russia
- Spain
- Switzerland
- Slovakia
- Chinese Taipei
- Thailand
- Ukraine
- United States
- Yemen

== Medallists ==
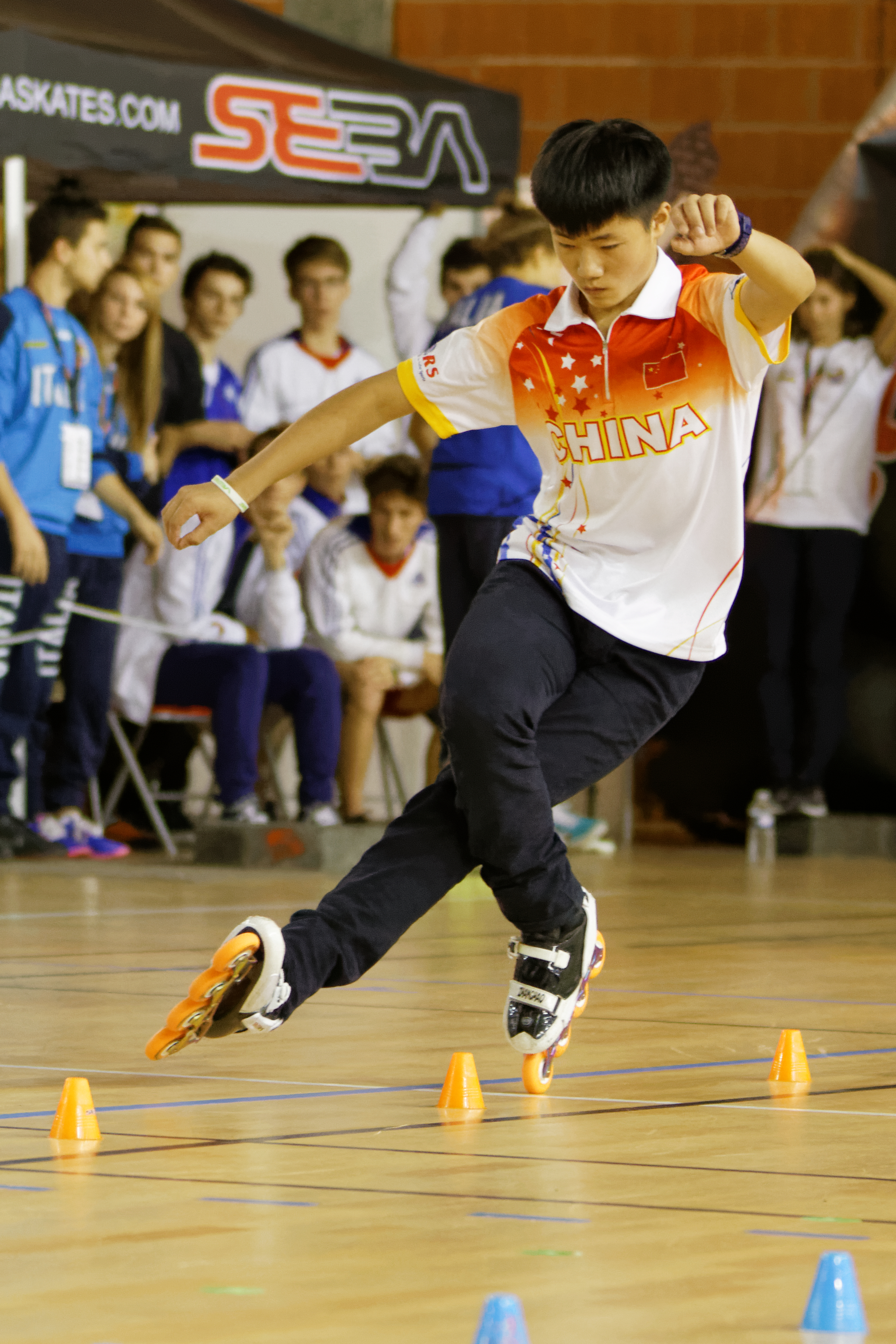
Zhang Hao

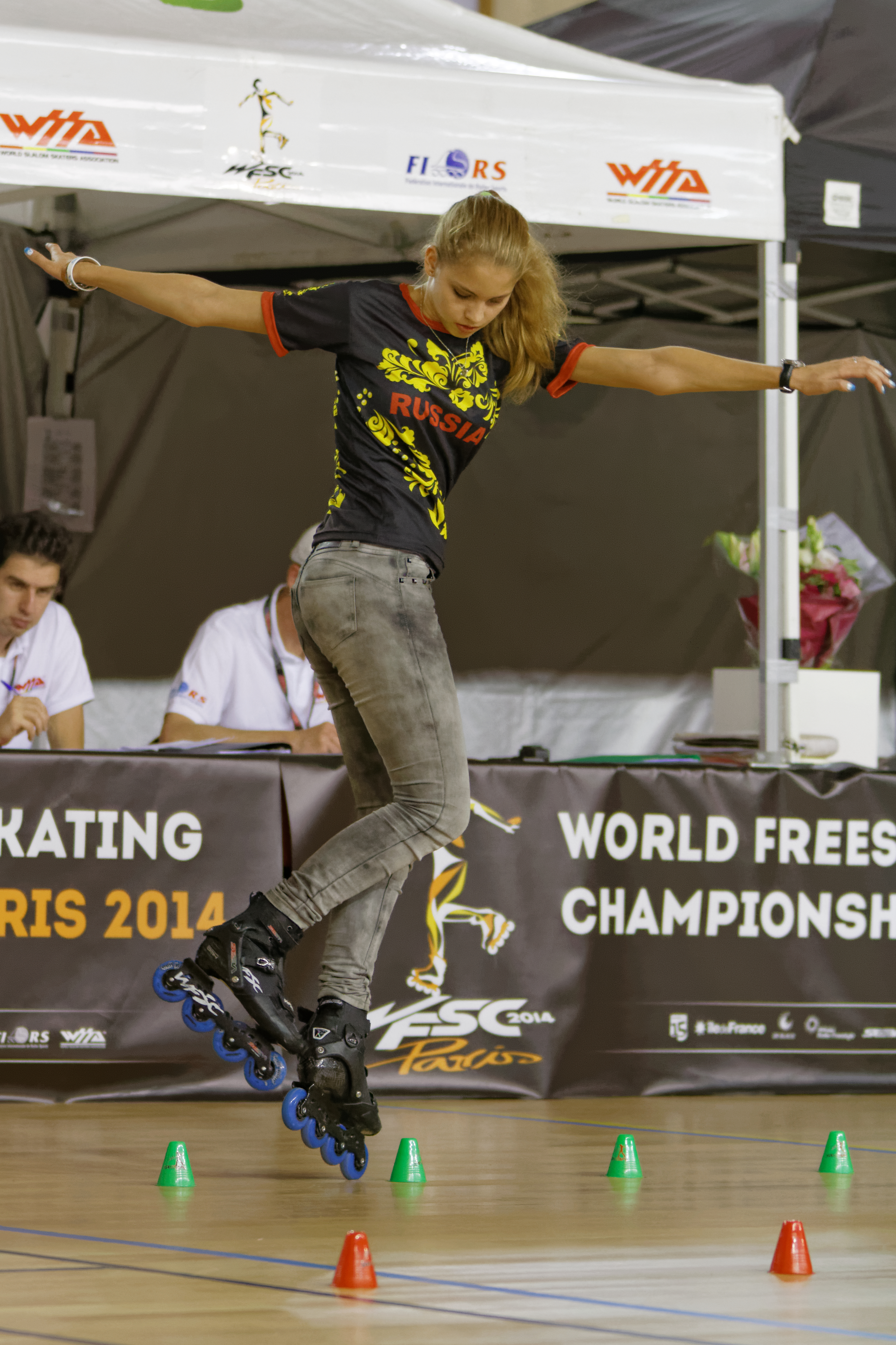
Dasha Kuznetsova

Event	Gold	Silver	Bronze
Free jump
Women	France (FRA); Maëliss Conan	France (FRA); Mallaury Dubernet	France (FRA); Maud Oguey
Men	France (FRA); Thomas Rataud	France (FRA); Flavien du Peloux	Italy (ITA); Enrico Sordi
Speed slalom
Junior Men	China (CHN); Pan Yu Shuo	Chinese Taipei (TPE); Xiao Bing Sheng	Hong Kong (HKG); Chan Man Fung Anson
Junior Women	China (CHN); Lu Qian Qian	Chinese Taipei (TPE); Lo Pei Yu	China (CHN); Feng Hui
Senior Men	Italy (ITA); Savio Brivio	France (FRA); Jimmy Fort	China (CHN); Ye Hao Qin
Senior Women	Chinese Taipei (TPE); Wang Tru Chien	Italy (ITA); Barbara Bossi	France (FRA); Zoé Granjon
Pair freestyle
	China (CHN); Zhang Hao and Guo Fang	Russia (RUS); Sergey Timchenko and Alexander Timchenko	Italy (ITA); Lorenzo Guslandi and Tiziano Ferrari
Freestyle slides
Men	China (CHN); Yang Huang Hai	Spain (ESP); Brais García Fernández	Ukraine (UKR); Aleksey Martsenyuk
Women	Ukraine (UKR); Bohdana Hotsko	Russia (RUS); Natalia Krykova	Russia (RUS); Olga Fokina
Freestyle Slalom « Classic »
Junior Men	China (CHN); Zhang Hao	China (CHN); Pan Yu Shuo	Hong Kong (HKG); Anson Chan Man Fung
Junior Women	China (CHN); Feng Hui	China (CHN); Guan Yu Xiang	Russia (RUS); Justyna Czapla
Senior Men	Russia (RUS); Sergey Timshenko	France (FRA); Alexandre Claris	China (CHN); Ye Hao Qin
Senior Women	Russia (RUS); Daria Kuznetsova	China (CHN); Su Fei Qian	Ukraine (UKR); Maryna Boiko
Freestyle Slalom « Battle »
Men	China (CHN); Zhang Hao	China (CHN); Ye Hao Qin	Russia (RUS); Sergey Timchenko
Women	Russia (RUS); Dasha Kuznetsova	China (CHN); Guan Yu Xiang	China (CHN); Feng Hui

== Medal table ==
Rank	Nation	Gold	Silver	Bronze	Total
1	China (CHN)	7	5	4	16
2	Russia (RUS)	3	2	3	8
3	France (FRA)	2	4	2	8
4	Chinese Taipei (TPE)	1	2	1	4
5	Italy (ITA)	1	1	2	4
6	Ukraine (UKR)	1	0	2	3
7	Spain (ESP)	0	1	0	1
8	Hong Kong (HKG)	0	0	2	2
Totals (8 entries)		15	15	16	46
